Mrunalini Kunte  (born 1973) is an Indian chess player and a Woman International Master.

She is also a winner of the 1996 Indian Chess Championship.

References 

1973 births
Living people
Indian female chess players
Sportswomen from Maharashtra
Chess Woman International Masters
Marathi people
20th-century Indian women
20th-century Indian people